A council house is a form of British public housing built by local authorities.  A council estate is a building complex containing a number of council houses and other amenities like schools and shops. Construction took place mainly from 1919 after the Housing Act 1919 to the 1980s, with much less council housing built since then. There were local design variations, but they all adhered to local authority building standards. The Housing Acts of 1985 and 1988 facilitated the transfer of council housing to not-for-profit housing associations with access to private finance, and these new housing associations became the providers of most new public-sector housing. By 2003, 36.5% of the social rented housing stock was held by housing associations.

History
House design in the United Kingdom is defined by a series of Housing Acts, and public housing house design is defined by government directives and central governments' relationship with local authorities. From the first interventions in the Public Health Act 1875, council houses could be general housing for the working class, general housing, part of slum clearance programmes or just homes provided for the most needy. They could be funded directly by local councils, through central government incentive or by revenue obtained when other houses were sold. Increasingly, they have been transferred through the instrument of housing associations into the private sector.

First World War housing
Woolwich Borough Council was responsible for the Well Hall Estate designed for workers at the munition factories at Woolwich Arsenal. The estate and the house were built to the garden suburb philosophy: houses were all different. The estate received the royal seal of approval when, on Friday 24 March 1916, Queen Mary made an unannounced visit.

Interwar housing
A programme of council house building started after the First World War following on from the David Lloyd George’s government’s Housing Act of 1919. The 'Addison Act' brought in subsidies for council house building and aimed to provide 500,000 "homes fit for heroes" within a three-year period although less than half of this target was met.
The housing built comprised three-bedroom dwellings with parlour and scullery: larger properties also include a living room. The standards are based on the Tudor Walters Report of 1919, and the Design Manual written according to the 1913 building standards. 

In 1923 the Chamberlain Act withdrew subsidies for council houses except for private builders and houses for sale. Councils could undertake to build houses and offer these for sale but also to sell off some of their existing properties. This was essentially reversed by the incoming Labour government of 1924. The Wheatley Act (1924) passed by the new Labour Government introduced higher subsidies for council housing and also allowed for a contribution to be made from the rates. The housing revenue account was always separated from the general account. This was a major period of council house construction.

The Housing Act 1930 stimulated slum clearance, i.e., the destruction of inadequate houses in the inner cities that had been built before the 1875 Act. This released land for housing and the need for smaller two bedroomed houses to replace the two-up two-down houses that had been demolished. Smaller three bedroom properties were also built. The Housing Act 1935 led to a continuation of this policy,  but the war stopped all construction, and enemy action reduced the usable housing stock.

Post-World War II housing

Prefabs 
The Housing (Temporary Accommodation) Act 1944 led to the building of prefab bungalows with a design life of ten years. Innovative steel-framed properties were also tried in an attempt to speed up construction. A number survive well into the 21st century, a testament to the durability of a series of housing designs and construction methods only envisaged to last 10 years.

The Burt Committee, formed in 1942 by the wartime government of Winston Churchill, proposed to address the need for an anticipated 200,000 shortfall in post-war housing stock, by building 500,000 prefabricated houses, with a planned life of up to 10 years within five years of the end of the Second World War. The eventual bill, under the post-war Labour government of Prime Minister Clement Attlee, agreed to deliver 300,000 units within 10 years, within a budget of £150m. Of 1.2 million new houses built from 1945 to 1951 when the programme officially ended, 156,623 prefab houses were constructed.

New Towns Act housing 
Mainly during the immediate post-war years, and well into the 1950s, council house provision was shaped by the New Towns Act 1946 and the Town and Country Planning Act 1947 of the 1945–51 Labour government. At the same time this government introduced housing legislation that removed explicit references to housing for the working class and introduced the concept of "general needs" construction (i.e., that council housing should aim to fill the needs for a wide range of society). In particular, Aneurin Bevan, the Minister for Health and Housing, promoted a vision of new estates where "the working man, the doctor and the clergyman will live in close proximity to each other".

Landlord's obligations

A landlord's obligations are set out in several pieces of legislation, including the Landlord and Tenant Act 1985, which applies to tenancies entered into after 1961. In summary, section 11 provides that a landlord shall:

 keep in repair the structure and exterior of the dwelling, including drains, gutters and external pipes;
 keep in repair and proper working order the installations in the dwelling for the supply of water, gas, and electricity, and for sanitation (including basins, sinks, baths and sanitary conveniences, but not other fixtures, fittings and appliances for making use of the supply of water, gas or electricity), and keep in repair and proper working order the installation in the dwelling for space heating and heating water.

If a landlord refuses to repair a rented property, the tenant can take action to require them to carry out necessary works and claim compensation.

Design

Addison Act housing (1918–1923)

The Addison Act 1919 houses were usually three-bedroom houses with a living room and scullery, sometimes also with a parlour. Some had two, four, or even five bedrooms, as well as generously sized back gardens intended for vegetable growing. At most, they were built at 3,000/km2. They were generally built to the recommendations of the Tudor Walters Report. Examples are found in Downham, Watling Estate, and Becontree.

Tudor Walters Committee recommendations

Labour government homes (1924–1930)
The Addison Act 1919, and the severe housing shortage in the early 1920s created the first generation of houses to feature electricity, running water, bathrooms, indoor toilets and front/rear gardens. However, until well into the 1930s, some were built with outdoor toilets.  Some did not feature an actual bathroom; the bath could often be found in the kitchen with a design which allowed it to double as a work surface. 

The Chamberlain Act 1923 reduced the expected standards. The Wheatley Act 1924 attempted to restore some of them. Under the Addison Act, a house would be  but after 1924 it would be . This was a major period of council house construction.

Smaller houses (1931–1939)
With the Housing Act of 1930, otherwise known as the Greenwood Act, the government signalled a change of priority, slum clearance. Pre-regulation terraced housing was to be cleared and the residents rehoused in new council houses.
There was a cut in funding and the housing density on the peripheral estates was increased leading to a poorer build quality. The former tenants of the inner city properties were displaced far from their workplaces unable to afford the higher rents (though reduced from the 1919 levels) or the cost of transport. Stable communities were broken up, and with it support networks.

Temporary prefabs (1941–1950)

These "service units" had to include a combined back-to-back prefabricated kitchen that backed onto a prebuilt bathroom, so water pipes, waste pipes and electrical distribution were all in the same place, and hence easy to install.
The house retained a coal-fire, with a back boiler to create both central heating and a constant supply of hot water. Thus it had a bathroom included a flushing toilet and man-sized bath with hot running water. In the kitchen were a built-in oven, refrigerator and baxi water heater. All prefabs under the housing act came pre-decorated in magnolia, with gloss-green on all additional wood, including the door trimmings and skirting boards.

Pre-cast reinforced concrete

Parker Morris homes
The Parker Morris Committee drew up an influential 1961 report on housing space standards in public housing in the United Kingdom titled Homes for Today and Tomorrow. The report concluded that the quality of social housing needed to be improved to match the rise in living standards. Out of the report came the Parker Morris Standards. In 1963 these were set out in the Ministry of Housing's "Design Bulletin 6 – Space in the Home". They became mandatory for all council houses from 1967 until 1980.  
Among the Parker Morris standards were the requirements saying that:
In one-, two- and three-bedroom dwellings, one flushing toilet is required, and it may be in the bathroom.
A semi-detached or end-of-terrace house for four people should have a net floor area of 72 m2.
A dwelling for three or more people should have enclosed storage space for the kitchen of 2.3 cubic metres.
Dwellings should be fitted with heating systems that maintain the kitchen and circulation space at 13 °C, and the living and dining spaces at 18 °C, when the external temperature is -1 °C.

Tower blocks

Particularly in larger cities, councils built high-rise blocks from the 1960s to the 1980s to accommodate a high density of dwellings at relatively low cost. Notable schemes include Park Hill in Sheffield, Hulme Crescents in Manchester, Cottingley in Leeds, Churchill Gardens in London, and many examples in Glasgow.

Radburn Style Estates 1970s

The Radburn housing layout that aimed to separate cars from housing was used extensively in new towns. As a result, the houses are accessible to the front only by footpaths. This has created areas with poor surveillance, particularly over car parking at the rear, which have become the focus of crime. In Skelmersdale, tenants are calling for their Radburn style housing to be remodelled so that defensible space is created with parking close to their homes and a reduction in general use areas which give rise to anti-social behaviour.

21st century revival
There was a revival in council housebuilding in the 2010s, with a focus on energy efficiency. Schemes such as Accordia in Cambridge and Goldsmith Street in Norwich have won awards. In London, space standards have been reintroduced via the London Plan, and councils including Southwark and Hounslow are building thousands of new council houses.

Historical statistics on housing construction
Dwellings completed by local authorities, New Towns, and the Scottish Housing Association, 1945–80 (thousands)

See also
List of large council estates in the UK
Public housing in the United Kingdom
Affordable housing
Subsidized housing
Housing estate
New Towns in the United Kingdom

References

Bibliography

External links

 BBC NEWS: "Council home for sale at £895,000".
 Website of the campaign to "Defend Council Housing" against privatisation.
 Social Housing Law Association.
 Council house exchange Describing how mutual exchange schemes operate.
Harold Hill: A People's History Recollections of former and current residents of the Harold Hill council estate.

House types
Public housing in the United Kingdom
Housing in the United Kingdom